Your Filthy Little Mouth is the fourth full-length studio LP by David Lee Roth, then the former lead singer of the American rock band Van Halen. It was produced by Nile Rodgers whose work had included David Bowie and Madonna, and released in 1994 by Reprise Records.

Overview
Released near Roth's critical and commercial nadir, Your Filthy Little Mouth did not conform to the expectations of rock music during 1994 (such as grunge rock), nor to the public's perception of Roth. The album features stripped-down arrangements that can be categorized as diversely as jazz fusion, dance, country, reggae, R&B, big band, rock, and blues.  However, the commercial specialization of TV and radio formats during the early 1990s left such diverse albums with few options for airplay.

The B-Side to "She's My Machine", an atmospheric blues song titled  "Mississippi Power", is available on the Japanese release.

Reception
At the time of its release in 1994, Your Filthy Little Mouth received mixed reviews from music critics, and with particularly negative responses coming from heavy metal critics. While Roth's newly intricate lyrics were well-received, the wide range of genre exercises on Your Filthy Little Mouth earned Roth commensurate praise and derision. Deborah Frost of Entertainment Weekly graded the album a "B+", noting that "thanks to Nile Rodgers' skillful production, the result is Roth's most listenable, insightful, and hysterical effort in years." Randy Krbechek of MetroNews notes that "the album improves as it progresses; the horn-driven "A Little Luck" and "Cheatin' Heart Cafe", a duet with Travis Tritt, are substantial improvements, as is "Sunburn," with its snaky guitar intro".

Like Roth's earlier solo LP, Skyscraper (1988), Your Filthy Little Mouth met with a tepid response from listeners and critics who expected Roth to reproduce the hard rock sound of classic Van Halen; others criticized him for not distancing himself enough from the sound of classic-era Van Halen. In 2007, the album was remastered and re-released on the Friday music label.

"She's My Machine" became a rock radio hit in early 1994, reaching #12 on Billboards Rock Charts.

Track listing
"She's My Machine" (Monty Byrom, David Neuhauser, David Lee Roth) – 3:53
"Everybody's Got the Monkey" (Frank Simes, Joey Hunting, Roth) – 3:01  	
"Big Train" (Terry Kilgore, Roth, Joey Hunting, Preston Sturges) – 4:14  	
"Experience"  (Kilgore, Roth) – 5:54  	
"A Little Luck" (Eddie Anderson, Steve Hunter, Roth) – 4:40
"Cheatin' Heart Cafe" (Kilgore, Roth) – 4:06
"Hey, You Never Know" (Kilgore, Roth) – 2:46
"No Big 'Ting" (Kilgore, Roth) – 4:51
"You're Breathin' It" (Richard Hilton, Kilgore, Roth) – 3:46  	
"Your Filthy Little Mouth" (Kilgore, Roth) – 3:02
"Land's Edge" (Kilgore, Roth) – 3:12
"Night Life" (Walt Breeland, Paul Buskirk, Willie Nelson) – 3:35
"Sunburn" (Kilgore, Roth) – 4:42
"You're Breathin' It" [Urban NYC Mix] (Kilgore, Roth) – 4:13

Personnel
Musicians
 David Lee Roth – lead vocals
 Terry Kilgore – guitar
 John Regan – bass
 Tony Beard – drums
 Larry Aberman – drums
 Ray Brinker – drums
 Travis Tritt – co-lead vocals on "Cheatin' Heart Cafe"
 Steve Hunter – guitar on "A Little Luck"
 Richard Hilton – programming and keyboards

Technical
 Gary Tole – recording and mixing engineer
 Mike Thompson – assistant engineer
 Eddie Anderson – personal manager

Charts

References

1994 albums
David Lee Roth albums
Albums produced by Nile Rodgers
Warner Records albums